Brian Marsden (born 29 September 1947) is a weightlifter from New Zealand. He competed at the 1972 Summer Olympics in the Light-heavyweight class, and the 1976 Summer Olympics in the Middle-heavyweight class, coming 12th at each games.

He competed in the Men's 90 kg class at the 1974 British Commonwealth Games where he won a silver, and the 1978 Commonwealth Games where he won a bronze.

References

External links
Profile at NZOGC website

1947 births
Living people
New Zealand male weightlifters
Weightlifters at the 1974 British Commonwealth Games
Weightlifters at the 1978 Commonwealth Games
Commonwealth Games silver medallists for New Zealand
Weightlifters at the 1972 Summer Olympics
Weightlifters at the 1976 Summer Olympics
Olympic weightlifters of New Zealand
Commonwealth Games bronze medallists for New Zealand
Commonwealth Games medallists in weightlifting
20th-century New Zealand people
21st-century New Zealand people
Medallists at the 1974 British Commonwealth Games
Medallists at the 1978 Commonwealth Games